Mort is both a given name and surname.

Mort is a surname or family name in the United Kingdom, traditionally found in North West England, especially Lancashire. It is also found in the counties of Glamorganshire, Monmouthshire in South Wales, but is also found in many areas of the United Kingdom. The surname is also found in other countries from English/Scottish emigrants particularly the United States, Canada, Australia and New Zealand. Mort is also
a variant of the surname Morton.

Mort is a common masculine given name or nickname/hypocorism variant of Morton or Mortimer, particularly in the United States.

Mort may refer to:

Surname

 Jonathan Mort, Colombian - American actor and former teacher and politician
 Chris Mort, English lawyer and former chairman of Newcastle United Football Club
 David Mort (1888–1963), British politician
 Graham Mort, British writer, editor and tutor
 Greg Mort (born 1952), American painter
 Helen Mort (born 1985), British poet
 Henry Mort (1818–1900), pastoralist, businessman and politician in what is now Australia
 Ian Mort (1937–1996), Australian rules footballer
 John Mort (1915–1997), Anglican bishop
 Thomas Mort (1897–1967), English footballer
 Thomas Sutcliffe Mort (1816–1878), Australian industrialist
 Valzhyna Mort (born Valhyna Martynava in 1981), Belarusian poet

Given name or nickname
 Mort Abrahams (1916–2009), American film and television producer
 Mort Castle (born 1946), American horror author and writing teacher
 Morton Mort Cooper (1913–1958), American Major League Baseball pitcher
 Mort Crim (born 1935), American author and former broadcast journalist
 Mort Dixon (1892–1956), American lyricist
 Mort Drucker (born 1929), American caricaturist and comics artist best known for his work in Mad magazine
 Morton Mort Garson (1924–2008), Canadian-born composer, arranger, songwriter and pioneer of electronic music
 Mort Gerberg (born 1931), American cartoonist and author
 Morton Horwitz (born 1938), American legal historian and Harvard law professor nicknamed "Mort the Tort"
 Morton Mort Kaer (1902–1992), American football player and pentathlete
 Mort Kondracke (born 1939), American political commentator and journalist 
 Mort Künstler (born 1927), American painter
 Mort Landsberg (1919–1970), American NFL player
 Mortimer Mort Leav (1916–2005), American comic book and advertising artist
 Mort Lindsey (1923–2012), American orchestrator, composer, pianist, conductor and musical director
 Morton Mort Meskin (1916–1995), American comic book artist
 Mort Mills (1919–1993), American actor born Mortimer Morris Kaplan
 Mort Nathan, American television producer, screenwriter and film director best known for his work on The Golden Girls
 Mort O'Shea (1882–1970), Irish Gaelic footballer
 Mort Rosenblum (born 1944), American author, editor and journalist
 Morton Mort Sahl (born 1927), Canadian-born American comedian and social satirist
 Morton Mort Schell (born 1943), Australian former politician
 Mort Shuman (1938–1991), American singer, pianist and songwriter
 Mort Todd (born 1961), American writer and media entrepreneur, best known as an editor-in-chief of Cracked magazine
 Addison Morton Mort Walker (1923–2018), American comic strip artist (Beetle Bailey, Hi and Lois)
 Mortimer Mort Weisinger (1915–1978), American magazine and comic book editor

Fictional characters
 Mort, in the animated films Madagascar, Madagascar: Escape 2 Africa and Madagascar 3: Europe's Most Wanted
 Morton "Mort" Rainey, the main character of the 1990 short story Secret Window, Secret Garden by Stephen King, and the 2004 film adaptation
 Mort, in the Spanish comics series Mort & Phil
 Mort, a pelican in the American animated television series Camp Lazlo
 Mort, the main character of the Discworld novel Mort
 Mort Cinder, title character of the Mort Cinder Argentine comic book series
 Mort Goldman, in the animated television show Family Guy
 Mort Metzger, the sheriff in the television series Murder, She Wrote
 the title character of the video game Mort the Chicken
 Mort Pig, in the U.S. Acres segments on Garfield and Friends
 Uncle Mort, a character in the comic writings of Peter Tinniswood
 Morty Smith, of the animated television show Rick and Morty
Mort, mortician and friend of Bob Belcher in animated television series Bob's Burgers
 Mort, magical door knocker in Sarah J Maas' Throne of Glass
 Death (DC Comics)  - Also known as Madame Mort

See also
 R. Mort Frayn (1906–1993), American politician

English masculine given names
English given names
Masculine given names
Lists of people by nickname
Hypocorisms